The Reelers were an English Roots Rock 'n' Roll band. Formed in 2011 in Brixton, a suburb of London, the final line-up of the band comprised Cass Cook (vocals/guitar), Dan Regan (lead guitar), Kieran Grant (keys), James Godden (Sax), Rich Martin (Bass), and Tom Romer-Smith (drums).

The Reelers were featured by the BBC 6 Music "Introducing" shows and performed Live on the BBC London Sunday Night Sessions. Their debut EP And So it Begins was released in August 2011 and the debut single "London Lady" was featured as Jazz FM's "Single of the Week". The band performed at Glastonbury Festival 2013.

Musical influences and genre

The Reelers were 6 young Londoners from Brixton who met at dance clubs through the Roots revival scene then flourishing in London. The band was assembled by lead singer Cass Cook, with the mission to start making a fresh version of the 1950s black rock 'n' roll music, the origins of rock and roll, that never gained mainstream success due to the political and racial issues of the era. While vintage DJs such as Keb Darge and Paul Weller play out the reissues and originals of roots rock ‘n’ roll, R&B, northern soul and jump blues, Cass felt that there weren't any new or current bands playing or writing these genres of music, so they created a band that could fill the void and provide fans of those genres with something new, fresh and current to see live and listen to.

The Reelers didn't use any pitch correction software or digital production techniques. The EP And So It Begins was recorded by the band as a whole, not tracked. After recording their E.P. The Reelers were heavily supported by Tom Robinson from BBC 6 Music "Introducing", BBC London and had their track "London Lady" nominated as Single of the Week and had a Live show recorded and dedicated to them by Jazz FM.

Demise
After a successful run of festival dates in the summer of 2017, The Reelers suddenly split up in mysterious circumstances. It is believed most of the band left the country giving up music altogether.

References

External links
 Official web site
 BBC's Introducing

English rock music groups
Musical groups established in 2011
People from Brixton
Musical groups from London
2011 establishments in England